Arslan Toğuz also known as Arslan Toğuzata, Arslan Bey (1886; Göksun - June 7, 1963; Pazarcık) was a police commissioner of the Ottoman Empire, a militia leader and politician of Turkey.

He was born in the village of Fındık (in present-day Göksun district of Kahramanmaraş Province) as a son of Çerkez Hasanbeyzade Abdullah Bey.

See also
List of recipients of the Medal of Independence with Red-Green Ribbon (Turkey)

Sources

External links

1886 births
1963 deaths
People from Göksun
Turkish people of Circassian descent
Police officers from the Ottoman Empire
Ottoman military personnel of World War I
Members of Kuva-yi Milliye
Turkish militia officers
Turkish military personnel of the Franco-Turkish War
Deputies of Kahramanmaraş
Recipients of the Medal of Independence with Red-Green Ribbon (Turkey)